International Hits may refer to:

International Hits (Jo Stafford album), 2001
The World's Greatest International Hits, a 1965 Petula Clark album
Elvis Presley international hit singles